Sussex Downs Area of Outstanding Natural Beauty in England was designated in 1966. The designation was revoked in March 2010, together with the neighbouring East Hampshire AONB, upon the establishment of the South Downs National Park.

The area of the AONB was largely the same as the portion of the National Park within East and West Sussex, containing the South Downs as well as part of The Weald.

In the latter years of the AONB, the management of the two AONBs of Sussex Downs and East Hampshire was combined under the South Downs Joint Committee, taking responsibility for conservation within the two areas in anticipation of the National Park.

References

Areas of Outstanding Natural Beauty in England
Nature reserves in East Sussex
Nature reserves in West Sussex
1966 establishments in England
Protected areas established in 1966